The 1925 Cork Intermediate Hurling Championship was the 16th staging of the Cork Intermediate Hurling Championship since its establishment by the Cork County Board.

Glen Rovers won the championship following a 7–2 to 2–3 defeat of Inniscarra in the final.

Results

Final

References

Cork Intermediate Hurling Championship
Cork Intermediate Hurling Championship